Nuestra Belleza Latina 2018, the 11th season of the program, premiered on September 23, 2018. In February 2017, the program was rested after ten seasons of broadcasting. However, in May 2018, it was announced that the program would return the following September. This would be the first season in the history of the show to premiere  during the fall, as the previous ten all took place during the springtime. Several changes were implemented in the format such as removing the age and weight limit requirements as seen before. Migbelis Castellanos would be crowned the winner of this season on December 2, 2018.

2018 Contestants

References

Univision original programming
2018 beauty pageants
Nuestra Belleza Latina